HD 168009 is a star in the northern constellation of Lyra. It has an apparent visual magnitude of 6.3, placing it just above to below the normal limit of stars visible to the naked eye under good viewing conditions of 6-6.5. An annual parallax shift of  provides a distance estimate of 76 light years. It is moving closer to the Sun with a heliocentric radial velocity of −65 km/s.

This is a solar analog, which means its measured properties are similar to those of the Sun. However, it is much older than the Sun with an estimated age of around 8.1 billion years. The spectrum matches a stellar classification of G1 V, indicating this is an ordinary G-type main-sequence star that is generating energy through hydrogen fusion at its core. The level of chromospheric activity is low, making it a candidate for a Maunder minimum event.

HD 168009 has about the same mass as the Sun, but is 14% larger in radius. It has a similar metallicity to the Sun – what astronomers term the abundance of elements other than hydrogen and helium – and is spinning with a rotation period of six days. The star is radiating 1.43 times the Sun's luminosity from its photosphere at an effective temperature of 5,792 K. It has been examined for an infrared excess that may indicate the presence of a circumstellar disk of dust, but no statistically significant excess was detected.

Planetary system
In 2020, a candidate exoplanet was detected orbiting this star. With a minimum mass of 0.03  (9.5 ) and an orbital period of 15 days, this would most likely be a hot mini-Neptune. The planet existence was confirmed in 2021.

References

G-type main-sequence stars
Solar analogs
Maunder Minimum
Planetary systems with one confirmed planet

Lyra (constellation)
BD+45 2684
9622
168009
089474
6847
J18153245+4512333